The Burnett Transit Center is an elevated light rail station on the METRORail Red Line in Houston, Texas, United States.  It was built as part of the North/Red Line Extension, and opened on December 21, 2013.

It has three tracks accessed by two island platforms, one for each direction.  The center track is used by northbound trains short-turning to return southbound.  These trains unload passengers onto the eastern (northbound) platform, and load passengers from the western (southbound) platform.

The station features a six-bay bus terminal and a "Kiss and Ride" facility at ground level.

The station is located above the intersection of North Main Street and Burnett Street, which was once proposed for a multimodal transit hub prior to 2011.

Bus connections
3 Langley-Little York
51 Hardy-Kelley
52 Hardy-Ley
79 Irvington

References

External links
Ridemetro.org
Ridemetro.org

METRORail stations
Railway stations in the United States opened in 2013
Railway stations in Harris County, Texas